George-Auguste Gigault (November 23, 1845 – April 25, 1915) was a notary, civil servant and political figure in Quebec. He represented Rouville in the House of Commons of Canada from 1878 to 1891 as a Conservative and then independent Conservative member. His first name also appears as Georges-Auguste.

He was born in Saint-Mathias, Canada East, the son of Pierre Gigault and Marguerite Wait, and was educated at the Séminaire de Saint-Hyacinthe. Gigault went on to study law in Montreal and was licensed to practise as a notary in 1867. He practised in Saint-Césaire and later in Sainte-Foy. In 1870, he married Isabella Dillon. Gigault was an unsuccessful candidate for a seat in the House of Commons in 1874. He served as mayor of St-Césaire from 1875 to 1878. He also served as postmaster. Opposed to the execution of Louis Riel, he declared himself a Nationalist Conservative in 1885 and ran as an independent Conservative in 1887. Gigault was defeated when he ran for reelection in 1891. In 1892, he was an unsuccessful candidate for the Rouville seat in the Quebec legislative assembly. Later that year, he was named assistant commissioner in the Quebec Department of Agriculture and Colonization. In 1897, after the department was split, he became assistant commissioner in the Department of Agriculture. He died on his farm in Sainte-Foy at the age of 69.

Electoral record

References 

 

1845 births
1915 deaths
Members of the House of Commons of Canada from Quebec
Conservative Party of Canada (1867–1942) MPs
Mayors of places in Quebec
Nationalist Conservative MPs